The 2009–10 Auburn Tigers women's basketball team represented Auburn University in the 2009–10 NCAA Division I basketball season, coached by Nell Fortner. The Tigers are a member of the Southeast Conference.

Offseason
May 27:A trio of former Auburn women's basketball players squared off in WNBA preseason action with the Phoenix Mercury downing the Sacramento Monarchs, 74-70. DeWanna Bonner, the 2009 SEC Player of the Year and first-round draft pick of the Mercury, logged 19 minutes of action while picking up 10 points and a team-high six rebounds. Bonner also tallied two steals while making her WNBA preseason debut.

See also
2009–10 NCAA Division I women's basketball season

References

External links
Official Site

Auburn Tigers women's basketball seasons
Auburn